Metro Herald is the name of multiple newspapers:

 Metro Herald (Irish newspaper)
 Metro Herald (Virginia)

See also 
 Herald (newspaper)